Sankt Lorenzen may refer to the following places:

Styria (Austria)
Sankt Lorenzen am Wechsel
Sankt Lorenzen bei Knittelfeld
Sankt Lorenzen bei Scheifling
Sankt Lorenzen im Mürztal

Italy
St. Lorenzen (It. : San Lorenzo di Sebato), in Trentino-Alto Adige/Südtirol

See also
Sankt Lorenz, a municipality in Upper Austria